The West Fourth Street District is an historic district in Maysville, Kentucky comprising five residences.  The structures are situated on Fourth Street between Market and Sutton Streets.  Construction is brick in the Greek Revival style with little exterior ornamentation.  Parapets and stepped gables - reflecting the influence of German immigrants - are characteristic of river towns but unusual elsewhere in Kentucky.

The five houses were constructed between 1840 and 1849. Both Ficklin House and Bierbower houses were built circa 1840.   33 and 31 West Fourth Street are row houses and a deed provides validation that 33 was in existence by 1847.  29 West Fourth Street was constructed in 1849.

References

National Register of Historic Places in Mason County, Kentucky
Geography of Mason County, Kentucky
Historic districts on the National Register of Historic Places in Kentucky
Houses in Maysville, Kentucky
Houses on the National Register of Historic Places in Kentucky
Greek Revival architecture in Kentucky